Thai animation has a rich history, dating back to the 1950s with the production of the first Thai animated shorts. Payut Ngaokrachang is considered the founding father of Thai animation. Over the decades, the industry has flourished, earning both local and international recognition. Today, Thailand has established itself as a popular outsourcing destination for animation work, with 91% of its animation studios providing services to international companies. This has boosted exports and raised the profile of Thai animation, earning recognition from the Japan External Trade Organization (JETRO) as the top animation-related business destination in Southeast Asia in 2016.

History

Early beginnings
Thai animation has a rich history dating back to the mid-20th century. The first Thai animated shorts were created using traditional hand-drawn animation techniques, with "Amazing Incidents" premiering in 1955 at the Sala Chaloem Thai. This animation, which had a runtime of 10 minutes, caught the attention of the American News Agency (USIS) in Bangkok where Payut Ngaokrachang was working as an art officer. Payut Ngaokrachang, considered a pioneer of Thai animation and a prominent animator and illustrator, was then invited to visit Toho in Japan to receive training in making animated films. He went on to create "The New Adventures of Hanuman" in 1957, which had a runtime of 14.43 minutes, and "The Children and the Bear" in 1959, which was 14 minutes long. These two animations were created while Payut was working on animation in Japan for the American News Agency, according to the agency's objective of creating an animated film against communism.

In 1979, Payut Ngaokrachang created his first full-length animated film "The Adventure of Sudsakorn", which was based on the story of the poet Sunthon Phu and had a runtime of 82 minutes, consisting of 66,000 paintings. The film is widely considered a significant milestone in Thai animation history, and it was the first feature-length animated film produced in Thailand using traditional hand-drawn animation techniques. The film was a huge success, earning 2 million baht at the Athens Ratchathewi theater and making a significant impact on the Thai animation industry

1999–present
In 1999, Broadcast Thai Television adapted Thai literary works into 2D animated TV shows, such as "Pla Boo Thong", "Sang Thong", "Ngo Pa", and "Lok Nithan", which revitalized the Thai animation industry. Three years later in 2002, the Thai 3D animation industry saw the release of "PangPond The Future World Adventure", adapted from a comic, which marked a golden year for the industry. The animation first aired as an episodic series on Channel 3 in April before being edited into the feature film "" by Vithita Animation in October. Directed by Chaiporn Panichrutiwong, a rising star in the animation industry, the film was well-received and went on to become one of Thailand's leading animation franchises. It was also the first Thai animation to be shown in IMAX theaters. 

In the same year, "King Vikram and Vetal The Vampire", directed by Suthep Tantirooj and Panuthep Sutthepthamrong and animated by Anya Animation studio, was the first Thai 3D computer-animated film. It premiered at the Hiroshima International Animation Festival in Japan in August 2002 before being shown in festivals in Thailand. Despite being the first of its kind in Thailand, it was not until later that it gained recognition as a significant milestone in Thai animation.

In 2007, Vithita Animation released the 2D animated series "Ramakien Mini Animation". Based on the Ramakien epic, the animated series was well-received and has continued to be a favorite among audiences, becoming a phenomenon for the animation industry in Thailand and leading to the sale of character rights for use in advertising and production of copyrighted products.

Other notable TV series animated during this era include "Shelldon", created by Shellhut Entertainment and directed by Jirayuth Chusanachoti with a budget of around 100 million baht. The series was first debuted in the Thailand Animation Festival in 2005 and later broadcast on Channel 3 in 2008. It was shown in over 150 countries and its license was purchased in over 16 countries, leading to the creation of three seasons. Another series, "Paddle Pop Adventures", was created by The Monk Studios and was released in 2005, launching in over 33 countries.

Thai animation has come a long way since its early beginnings, and the industry has seen many significant milestones along the way. In 2006, Kantana Animation released the animated film "Khan Kluay", which was a turning point for the industry in terms of both budget and quality. The film, set in the Ayutthaya period, follows the adventures of Khan Kluay and captures the identity and symbols of Thailand. Directed by Kompin Kemgumnird, who has worked with renowned studios such as Walt Disney and Blue Sky Studios, "Khan Kluay" was a commercial success and became the highest-grossing film of the year in Thailand.

Kantana Animation started in 1987 as a subcontractor for Japan's Toei. In 1994, it produced its first Thai animated series, "Twin Witches". In addition to original productions, the company is also known for its outsourcing work, contributing to well-known works such as "Saint Seiya" and "Dragon Ball". Today, Kantana continues to offer outsourcing services to the Japanese animation industry.

2007 saw the release of the 2D computer-animated film "The Life of Buddha". The film, which recounts the story of Lord Buddha, was produced by Media Standard Company and directed by Kritsaman Wattananarong. The technical director, Wisanukorn Kongsomsak, had previously worked for Thai Wang Film Productions, which outsourced work for major studios such as Walt Disney and Warner Bros.

BeboydCG Studio, a subsidiary of True Corporation, and Sahamongkol Film collaborated on the animated film "Nak" which was released in 2008. The film uses both 2D image processing and 3D techniques to create characters and scenes and features the ghost character Mae Nak, based on the figure of the Thai female spirit who has a baby and can stretch her arms. The film was a hit and received praise for its cute and fun story that also conveyed moral themes.

The success of "Khan Kluay" led to the creation of its sequel, "Khan Kluay 2", which was released in 2009. In 2012, Kantana Animation released its third animated film, "Echo Planet", a 90-minute 3D stereoscopic film. Despite a large investment of 170 million baht, the film only earned 17 million baht domestically.

In October 2012, the 3D animated film "Yak: The Giant King" was released. The film, a joint venture worth over 100 million baht by Sahamongkol Film and Ittirit House, was directed by Prapas Cholsaranon and produced by Workpoint Pictures. The film took nearly 6 years and a team of 30 people to create, showcasing the dedication and talent of the Thai animation industry.

With a budget of 230 million baht, "The Legend of Muay Thai: 9 Satra" is a 2018 animated film directed by Pongsa Kornsri, Nat Yoswatananont, and Gun Phansuwon. It was a collaboration between Igloo Studio, Exformat Films, and RiFF Studio, distributed by M Pictures. The film follows the story of a young boy named Ott, who becomes a Muay Thai warrior to save his village from the occupation of Ramthep Nakorn by Asura. Despite generating an impressive 20 million baht in earnings within just the first four days of its release and earning 100 million baht nationwide by the year of its release, it did not recoup its entire budget in the same year. Nevertheless, the film was released on Netflix, allowing it to reach a wider international audience. It is known for its animation, which sets a new standard and demonstrates the growth and development of Thai animation.

Studios

Animations

Animation films

Animation series

Short animation

Animators
 Payut Ngaokrachang
 Chaiporn Panichrutiwong
 Kompin Kemgumnird

See also
 Cinema of Thailand
 Anime

References

Sources

External links
 List of CG & VFX Studio

 
Mass media in Thailand